Campofrío is a town and municipality located in the province of Huelva, Spain. According to the 2005 census, it has a population of 810 inhabitants and covers a 48 km² area (16 people/km²).

Demographics

References

External links
Campofrío - Sistema de Información Multiterritorial de Andalucía

Municipalities in the Province of Huelva